Sunnmørsalpane is a collective term for the mountains range in the Sunnmøre region of Møre og Romsdal county, Norway.  The mountain range encircles the Hjørundfjorden in the municipalities of Volda, Ørsta, Stranda, and Sykkylven. These mountains have peaks reaching  straight up from the fjord.

Well-known peaks include Slogen, Randers Topp, Jakta, Kolåstinden, Hornindalsrokken, Kvitegga, Skårasalen, and Råna. The area is well known to hiking and skiing enthusiasts, especially for its long skiing season until beginning of June. The mountain range is visible from Ålesund's eastern suburbs.

References

External links

Landforms of Møre og Romsdal
Mountain ranges of Norway
Ørsta
Volda
Stranda
Sykkylven